Aristotelia ericinella is a moth of the family Gelechiidae. It is found in most of Europe, except most of the Balkan Peninsula.

The wingspan is 9–13 mm.
The forewings are dark fuscous; a dorsal streak to beyond middle, and sometimes a posterior spot in disc reddish ochreous ; a spot on dorsum at base, an oblique fascia at 1/4 , a costally furcate fascia in middle, a tornal spot, a costal spot beyond it, and some terminal dots rosy silvery; stigmata sometimes obscurely blackish. Hindwings are grey. The larva is ochreous-brown, rosy-tinged ; subdorsal line dark brown, partly edged with pale yellowish ; spiracular pale yellowish,
slender ; head and front of 2 pale brown.

Adults are on wing from July to August.

The larvae feed on Calluna species and Empetrum nigrum. They feed from a silken tube which is formed among the leaves. Larvae can be found from September to June.

References

Moths described in 1839
Aristotelia (moth)
Moths of Europe